''' or K G Valasu is a village in Erode district in the Indian state of Tamil Nadu located near to the northern banks of Noyyal River.

Demographics

KG valasu is well known for Hand made Bed sheets, towels and Agriculture. Many people here are running their Business in Power Looms.

Tourist places near by

 Chennimalai Subramanyaswamy Temple
 Sivanmalai Subramanyaswamy Temple
 Orathupalayam Dam
 Vellode Birds Sanctuary

Agriculture

Lower Bhavani Project Canal irrigates near by villages such as Thalavumalai, Vadugapalayam, Uppilipalayam, and Kuppichipalayam.
The principal crops are rice, coconut, turmeric, sugarcane, tapioca, maize and vegetable crops.

St. Xavier's Roman Catholic Church in K.G. Valasu was established in 1853 and a new Church was rebuilt in 1999. Every year Feast was celebrated in December first week.

Education

Schools
 Kongu Vellalar Matriculation Hr Sec School, Muthayan Kovil, Chennimalai
 St.Xavier's R.C. Primary & High School, KG Valasu
 Komarappa Sengunthar Higher Secondary School, Chennimalai
 Young India Higher Secondary School, Chennimalai
 Navarasam Matriculation Higher Secondary School, Arachalur

Colleges
 MPNMJ Engineering College, Chennimalai
 Kongu Engineering College, Perundurai
 Erode Builders Institute of Technology, Nathakadaiyur
 Cherran Arts and Science College, Thittuparai
 Navarasam Arts and Science College for Women, Arachalur
 Shivparvathy mandradiar college of education, palayakottai

Famous personalities
 Dheeran Chinnamalai
 Tirupur Kumaran

Cinema theatres
 Annamar Theatre, Chennimalai

Neighbouring towns and cities

TransportationBus TransportThe SH37 Erode to Palani lies 3 km away from KG Valasu.RailwaysThe nearest railway station is Erode Junction(27 km).Airport'''

The nearest airport is Coimbatore International Airport(88 km)

References

Villages in Erode district